Kasaï-Oriental (French for "East Kasai") was one of the eleven provinces of the Democratic Republic of the Congo between 1966 and 2015, when it was split into the new, smaller Kasai-Oriental province, the Lomami and the Sankuru provinces.

It borders the provinces of Kasaï-Occidental to the west, Équateur to the northwest, Orientale to the northeast, Maniema to the east, and Katanga to the south. Kasaï-Oriental is one of the richest diamond producing regions in the world. The provincial capital is Mbuji-Mayi.

History

Kasaï-Oriental is inhabited by members of the Luba tribe.

Congo obtained independence from Belgium in 1960. Friction with Congo's other ethnic groups and encouragement by Belgian corporations hoping to keep their mining concessions led to the secession of the province of South Kasai as a separate state headed by Albert Kalonji.

After being repulsed, the Congo occupied the province in September 1961. Several thousand people were killed during the "pacification" of South Kasai, which lasted through the spring of 1962.

The population of Mbuji-Mayi grew rapidly with the immigration of Luba people from other parts of the country.

Diamond mining

The region in which Mbuji-Mayi is situated annually produces one-tenth in weight of the world's industrial diamonds, with mining managed by the Société Minière de Bakwanga. This is the largest accumulation of diamonds in the world, more concentrated than those at Kimberley, South Africa. Mbuji-Mayi handles most of the industrial diamonds produced in the Congo.

Political divisions
The former Kasai-Oriental was divided into the three districts of Tshilenge, Kabinda, and Sankuru; and the two cities of Mbuji-Mayi and Mwene-Ditu.  These were further divided into a total of 16 territories and 8 communes.

Languages
French is the official language. Tshiluba is one of the four national languages of the Democratic Republic of the Congo. Tshiluba is spoken by about 6.3 million people in the Kasai region.

Education
 University of Mbuji Mayi

See also
List of governors of Kasaï Oriental Province

References

 02
Former provinces of the Democratic Republic of the Congo (1966–2015)